Heaven Is Never Booked Up (German: Der Himmel ist nie ausverkauft) is a 1955 West German romantic comedy film directed by Alfred Weidenmann and starring Hardy Krüger, Irene Galter and Peer Schmidt.  It was shot at the Tempelhof Studios in West Berlin and on location around Berlin and Rome. The film's sets were designed by the art directors Emil Hasler and Walter Kutz.

Cast
 Hardy Krüger as Michael
 Irene Galter as Angelina Borelli
 Peer Schmidt as Robert
 Claus Biederstaedt as Franz
 Viktor de Kowa as Professor Behrens
 Charles Regnier as 	Herr Borelli
 Käthe Haack as Frau Borelli
 Maria Fris as Tänzerin 
 Friedel Hensch as Singer	
 Rainer Koechermann as	Tänzer

References

Bibliography
 Bock, Hans-Michael & Bergfelder, Tim. The Concise CineGraph. Encyclopedia of German Cinema. Berghahn Books, 2009.

External links 
 

1955 films
1955 comedy films
German comedy films
West German films
1950s German-language films
Films directed by Alfred Weidenmann
1950s German films
Films shot at Tempelhof Studios

de:Der Himmel ist nie ausverkauft